A marlinspike is a tool used for splicing and working with rope.

Marlinspike may also refer to:

 Terebra maculata, a snail known as the Marlinspike auger
 Marlinspike Hall, a château in Hergé's The Adventures of Tintin comics
 Moxie Marlinspike, a computer security expert